Golab or Gelab or Galab may refer to:
 Golab, Isfahan
 Gelab, Kerman
 Golab-e Bala
 Golab-e Pain
 Gulab, Iran
 Gulab-e Sofla
 Gulab-e Vosta
 Golab Rural District, in Isfahan Province